Peliocypas is a genus of beetles in the family Carabidae, containing the following species:

 Peliocypas alternans Jeannel, 1949 
 Peliocypas andrewesi Jedlicka, 1932 
 Peliocypas angulicollis (Jedlicka, 1864) 
 Peliocypas angulosus Jeannel, 1949 
 Peliocypas annamensis (Bates, 1889) 
 Peliocypas apicalis (Louwerens, 1953) 
 Peliocypas assamensis (Jedlicka, 1964) 
 Peliocypas bechynei Basilewsky, 1956 
 Peliocypas beesoni (Andrewes, 1933)  
 Peliocypas brahmaputra (Jedlicka, 1964) 
 Peliocypas catenatus (Bates, 1886) 
 Peliocypas chaudoiri (Barker, 1919) 
 Peliocypas chinensis Jedlicka, 1960 
 Peliocypas cordicollis (Bates, 1889) 
 Peliocypas cylindricollis Jeannel, 1949 
 Peliocypas debilis (Laferte-Senectere, 1849) 
 Peliocypas dissimilis (Klug, 1833) 
 Peliocypas drescheri (Andrewes, 1937) 
 Peliocypas eberti (Jedlicka, 1965)
 Peliocypas europroctoides (Bates, 1886) 
 Peliocypas fulgureus (Andrewes, 1930) 
 Peliocypas fuscus (Motschulsky, 1859) 
 Peliocypas gardneri (Andrewes, 1933) 
 Peliocypas hamatus Schmidt-Goebel, 1846 
 Peliocypas himalayicus Andrewes, 1923 
 Peliocypas horni Jedlicka, 1932 
 Peliocypas inflaticeps (Burgeon, 1937) 
 Peliocypas inornatus (Andrewes, 1929) 
 Peliocypas insularis Fairmaire, 1897 
 Peliocypas intermedius (Bates, 1886) 
 Peliocypas leptosomus (Andrewes, 1937) 
 Peliocypas levipennis (Andrewes, 1936) 
 Peliocypas litteratus (Andrewes, 1929) 
 Peliocypas longulus Jeannel, 1949  
 Peliocypas luridus Schmidt-Gobel, 1846 
 Peliocypas macellus (Andrewes, 1923) 
 Peliocypas melleus (Bates, 1886) 
 Peliocypas miwai (Jedlicka, 1940)
 Peliocypas nagatomii (Jedlicka, 1963) 
 Peliocypas natalensis (Chaudoir, 1876)  
 Peliocypas obenbergeri (Jedlicka, 1934)  
 Peliocypas ochroides Andrewes, 1933  
 Peliocypas olemartini (Kirschenhofer, 1986)
 Peliocypas oryctus (Andrewes, 1936) 
 Peliocypas pallidus (Chaudoir, 1878) 
 Peliocypas papua Darlington, 1968  
 Peliocypas probsti Kirschenhofer, 1994 
 Peliocypas psilus (Andrewes, 1923) 
 Peliocypas repandus (Walker, 1859) 
 Peliocypas sanatus Jedlicka, 1934 
 Peliocypas schereri Jedlicka, 1964 
 Peliocypas sicardi Jeannel, 1949  
 Peliocypas signatus (Jedlicka, 1934) 
 Peliocypas signifer Schmidt-Gobel, 1846 
 Peliocypas signifer Schmidt-Goebel, 1846 
 Peliocypas staneki (Jedlicka, 1934) 
 Peliocypas stepaneki (Jedlicka, 1934) 
 Peliocypas suensoni Kirschenhofer, 1986 
 Peliocypas suturalis Schmidt-Gobel, 1846 
 Peliocypas taborskyi (Jedlicka, 1934) 
 Peliocypas tomentosus (Jedlicka, 1934) 
 Peliocypas trigonus (Andrewes, 1934) 
 Peliocypas unicolor (Jedlicka, 1934) 
 Peliocypas uniformis (Fairmaire, 1888) 
 Peliocypas vietnamensis (Kirschenhofer, 1994) 
 Peliocypas villiersi (Burgeon, 1942) 
 Peliocypas vimmeri (Jedlicka, 1934) 
 Peliocypas vittiger (Andrewes, 1929)

References

Lebiinae